Thomas Gale (1635/36–1702) was an English classical scholar, antiquarian and cleric.

Thomas Gale may also refer to:

Thomas Gale (surgeon) (1507–1586), English surgeon
Tommy Gale (footballer, born 1895) (1895–1976), English footballer
Tommy Gale (footballer, born 1920) (1920–1975), English footballer
Tommy Gale (racing driver) (1934–1999), NASCAR race car driver

See also